Belavanaki is a village in southern state of Karnataka, India. It is located in Ron Taluka of Gadag district in Karnataka. It belongs to Belagavi Division.

Location
It is located:
 It is located 31 km towards North from district headquarters in Gadag
 19 km from Ron
 433 km from State capital Bangalore
 Mallapur (7 km), Yavagal (8 km), Hadli (10 km), Lingadal (11 km Balaganur (11 km) are the nearby villages to Belavanaki
 Belavanaki is surrounded by Naragund Taluk towards west, Navalgund Taluk towards west, Gadag Taluk towards South, Badami Taluk towards North
 Ron, Nargund, Navalgund, Gadag are the nearby Cities to Belavanaki
 As per constitution of India and Panchyati Raj Act, Belavanaki village is administered by Adhyaksha (Head of Village) who is elected representative of village.

Profile 
 Gram Panchayat:Belavanaki
 Village Panchayat Chairman:Hanamantappa Saidapur
 Number of Wards:06
 Number of Home hold:1,002 (census 2001)
 Assembly Constituency:Naragund Constituency
 Lokasabha Constituency:Bagalkot Lokasabha
 Member of Parliament:P C Gaddigoudar
 Member of Legislative Assembly:B R Yavagal (Naragund)

History and origin of the village name 
According to the Ron inscription introduces the Ganga subordinate Mahamandalika Butayya as the governor of Gangavadi-96,000, Belvola-300, Puligere-300 provinces in Saka 864 (A..D. 942) while his Kurtakoti inscription mentions the chief as holding charge of the same provinces in Saka 868 (A.D. 946) therefore scriptures of Rastrakuta and Chalukyas of Kalyana dynasties shows the existence of this village goes back to ninth and 10th century and it is also ruled by Maratha king Shivaji and Peshwas of 17th and 18th century. This village name may be derived from old name of ‘Belavala-nadu 300’(Deccan Plains) or Belvola-300 which means region consisting of 300 villages and also means fertile land.

People and village features 

Here people used to call Bolunki, Bolunaki in their own dialect while speaking. Belavanaki is considered to be one of the most important village where its development is considered. Educational institutions, small scale industries like cotton mills, and its history goes back to British colonial period these mills are started by the local feudal land lords. Nevertheless, these mills work in season time and moreover attraction of these mills is old charm where monumental structure and buildings are at the epicentre of the village. This village generally connected with five roads including state highway, it made village like semi urban area because it has school, colleges, bank,  film talkies, primary health centre, these urban like features attract peoples from all the villages which are surrounded with Belavanaki.and It is also a birthplace of S. R. Hiremath social activist and Founder President of Samaja Parivarthana Samudaya, National Committee for Protection of Natural Resources and India Development Service.

Culture and temples 
In Belavanaki, the majority of the peoples are Hindu and Muslims therefore all festivals are here two religions centric but despite of their different religious faith both they celebrate almost all the festivals, this shows us the village cultural heritage and harmony among the two religion. Local attractions are:
 Shree Veerabadreswara temple
 Rayara temple
 Basavanna Devara temple
 Mustigeri Dyamamma temple
 Gaali Durgamma temple
 Maruti temple
 Gurulingammmana Matt
 Balaganur Math
 Laxmi temple.
 Shivananda temple
 Gowri Gudi
 Amareshwara temple
 Mylaradevara Gudi
 Kappatana Gudi
 Doddeswara Gudi
 Kallibasaveswara Temple

 Katti Basavannana Gudi
 Nagappana Katti
 Akka Mahadevi Gudi
 Nandhi Basavannana Gudi.
 Mecca Masid

Here the newly carved statue of Veerabhadra which is considered to be best kind of sculpture in recent time in Karnataka, therefore people from various part of state use to come here to visit this temple.

Youth and self help groups 
Belavanaki is also not lacking behind for establishing organisations, co-operative societies, Self-help groups in the village. Here youth and peasant union are strong hold in raising issues of youths, farmers, women's, students in the Gram Sabha meeting.

Names of the youth and self-help groups in Belavanaki
 Bhumika Mahila swasahay sangha
 Salumarada Timmakka Swasahay Sangha
 Annapurneshwari Swasahay Sangha
 Vidyashree Swasahay Sangha
 Lakshmi Devi
 Renuka Sthri Shakti Sangha
 Sharada swasahay sangha
 Akkamahadevi Swasahay Sangha
 Dhaneshwari sthri Shakti Sangha
 Dyamavva Swasahay Sangha
 Gajanana Geleyara Balaga

 Bhagath Singh Yuvakara sangha

Education institutions 
 Shree Veerabadreswara arts and commerce composite pre-university College
 Kannada boys’ model school
 Kannada girl's model school
 Government Urdu primary School
 Navadarshan nursery English medium school

Demographics

As of 2001 India census, Belavanaki had a population of 5118 with 2642 males and 2476 females.

The population of children age 0–6 is 533 which makes up 11.01% of total population of village. Average Sex Ratio of Belavanaki village is 945 which is lower than Karnataka state average of 973. Child Sex Ratio for the Belavanaki as per census is 864, lower than Karnataka average of 948. village has lower literacy rate compared to Karnataka. In 2011, literacy rate of Belavanaki village was 71.41% compared to 75.36% of Karnataka. In Belavanaki Male literacy stands at 81.74% while female literacy rate was 60.60%.

Transportation
Ron is the nearest town to Belavanaki. Ron is 19 km from Belavanaki. Road connectivity is there from Ron to Belavanaki.

Nearby railway stations are: Mallapur Railway station - 5 km; Balganur- 10 km; Somankatti- 14 km and Hombal- 18 km.

Airports 
Hubli Airport- 69 km
Sambra Airport (Belagavi, Karnataka)- 116 km
Kolhapur Airport (Maharashtra)- 193 km
Dabolim Airport (Panaji, Goa)- 210 km

Places to visit 
Badami- 33 km
Pattadakkal- 45 km
Aihole- 57 km
Hubli- 64 km
Hospet- 111 km

Nearby cities 
Ron- 19 km
Naragund- 24 km
Navalgund- 25 km
Gadag- 31 km

Taluks 
Ron- 19 km
Naragund- 24 km
Navalgund- 25 km
Gadag- 31 km

District headquarters 
Gadag- 31 km
Bagalkot- 65 km
Dharwad- 74 km
Koppal- 81 km

See also
 Gadag
 Districts of Karnataka

References

James M. Campbell (1884). Gazetteer of Bombay Presidency Volume xxii Dharwar. Bombay: Government Central Press. p. 857.

External links 
 https://web.archive.org/web/20090409224557/http://gadag.nic.in/
 http://www.whatisindia.com/inscriptions/south_indian_inscriptions/volume_11/introduction1.html
 http://gazetteer.kar.nic.in/gazetteer/distGazetteer.html#
 https://archive.org/stream/karnatakainscrip014940mbp#page/n7/mode/2up
 https://books.google.com/books?id=pI9IAQAAMAAJ&pg=PP1#v=onepage&q&f=false

Villages in Gadag district